If You Don't Already Have a Look is a compilation album by the American rock music group The Dirtbombs.

The first disc of the album is all original songs by the Dirtbombs while the second disc is all cover songs. The title of the album comes from a memo sent from Little Steven to bands participating in a festival that will be broadcast worldwide on television and recommends "If your band does not have a "look" this might be a good time to consider it.".

Track listing

Disc one

Disc two

References

The Dirtbombs albums
2005 compilation albums
In the Red Records albums